Anamaria Ioniță (born 7 July 1988 in Brăila) is a Romanian athlete who specialises in the 400 metres and 400 metres hurdles.

Ioniță represented Romania at the 2010 European Championships in Athletics where she helped her team to the 4 × 400 metres relay final where they finished 8th.

References

External links 
 
 
 
 

1988 births
Living people
Sportspeople from Brăila
Romanian female sprinters
Romanian female hurdlers
World Athletics Championships athletes for Romania
Olympic athletes of Romania
Athletes (track and field) at the 2016 Summer Olympics